Astralium wallisi is a species of sea snail, a marine gastropod mollusk in the family Turbinidae, the turban snails.

This species is considered by the Australian Faunal Directory as a synonym of Astralium rhodostomum (Lamarck, 1822)

Description

Distribution
This species is endemic to Australia and was found on the Middleton Reef, a coral reef in the Tasman Sea.

References

 Iredale,T. 1937. Middleton and Elizabeth Reef, South Pacific Ocean. The Australian Zoologist 8: 232–261
 Williams, S.T. (2007). Origins and diversification of Indo-West Pacific marine fauna: evolutionary history and biogeography of turban shells (Gastropoda, Turbinidae). Biological Journal of the Linnean Society, 2007, 92, 573–592.

External links

wallisi
Gastropods of Australia
Gastropods described in 1937